Julia Karlernäs (also spelled Karlenäs; born 6 October 1993) is a Swedish professional footballer who plays as a midfielder for Italian Serie A club FC Como Women and the Sweden women's national team.

Club career
In the 2018 Damallsvenskan season, Karlernäs's 11 goals from midfield helped Piteå secure the League title and won her the Most Valuable Player award. She signed a new contract with the club shortly afterwards.

International career
Karlernäs was called up to the senior Sweden squad for the first time in June 2018. On 30 August 2018 she won her first cap as a substitute in a 3–0 2019 FIFA Women's World Cup qualifying win over the Ukraine at Gamla Ullevi. She won a second cap and made her first start for the national team in October, in a 2–1 win over rivals Norway.

Karlernäs has competed in the UEFA Womens  champions league with Piteå IF in 2019 and with BK Häcken in 2021.

References

External links

 
 Profile at Swedish Football Association (SvFF) 

1993 births
Living people
People from Torsby Municipality
Swedish women's footballers
Women's association football midfielders
Mallbackens IF players

Embry–Riddle Eagles athletes
College women's soccer players in the United States
Hammarby Fotboll (women) players
Piteå IF (women) players
Sevilla FC (women) players
Damallsvenskan players
Sweden women's international footballers
Swedish expatriate women's footballers
Swedish expatriate sportspeople in the United States
Expatriate women's soccer players in the United States
Swedish expatriate sportspeople in Spain
Expatriate women's footballers in Spain
Sportspeople from Värmland County